Anahí Durand Guevara (born 1 April 1978) is a Peruvian sociologist. Since 29 July 2021, she has served as the Minister of Women and Vulnerable Populations in the presidency of Pedro Castillo.

Biography
Durand is the daughter of the sociologist Julio Durand Lazo. She has a degree in sociology from the National University of San Marcos (UNMSM) and a master's degree in social sciences from the Latin American Faculty of Social Sciences. She has a doctorate in sociology from the National Autonomous University of Mexico. Durand is a professor at the Faculty of Social Sciences of the UNMSM. She is a specialist in social movements, political representation, indigenous peoples, interculturality and gender.

Political career
Durand is a member of the New Peru political party and was head of the government plan of presidential candidate Verónika Mendoza for the 2021 general election. In said election, she ran for Andean Parliament for Together for Peru without success. After the alliance for the second round between New Peru and Free Peru, the party of candidate Pedro Castillo, she became part of the technical team that drew up the government plan for the first 100 days.

Minister for Women and Vulnerable Populations
On 29 July 2021, Durand was appointed Minister of Women and Vulnerable Populations of Peru in the government of Pedro Castillo.

Citations

1978 births
Living people
People from Lima
Peruvian sociologists
Peruvian feminists
Peruvian women activists
Women government ministers of Peru
21st-century Peruvian women politicians
National Autonomous University of Mexico alumni
National University of San Marcos alumni
Academic staff of the National University of San Marcos
21st-century Peruvian politicians
Women's ministers of Peru